The Teros is a UAV developed by Navmar Applied Sciences Corporation.

Development
The NASC Teros UAS is a single-engine, low wing, V tail monoplane developed by Navmar Applied Sciences Corporation in collaboration with Sonex using the Sonex built Aircraft Waiex as a base airframe, powered by a turbocharged AeroConversions AeroVee 2180 engine, with fixed tricycle landing gear.

Sleek, aerobatic, and highly adaptable, the Teros from Navmar Applied Sciences Corporation is the perfect airframe for a multitude of UAV applications. Designed to meet the expanding requirement for an extended range, high altitude aircraft, the Teros can operate in a wide range of environments and excel at the most challenging missions.

The rugged and resilient Teros was derived from a proven airframe that has logged thousands of mishap-free flight hours. Its robust and unique construction makes it highly durable without adding unnecessary weight or sacrificing payload capacity. Putting it simply, the Teros is an American-Made solution that does the job at a fraction of the cost of similarly capable unmanned aerial vehicles.

Specifications (Teros)

References

External links

2010s United States sport aircraft
Unmanned aerial vehicles
V-tail aircraft
Single-engined tractor aircraft
Teros
Low-wing aircraft